Ahmed Halim Ibrahim (born 10 February 1910, date of death unknown) was an Egyptian football midfielder who played for Egypt in the 1934 FIFA World Cup. He also played for Zamalek SC, and represented Egypt at the 1936 Summer Olympics.

References

1910 births
Egyptian footballers
Egypt international footballers
Association football midfielders
Zamalek SC players
1934 FIFA World Cup players
Olympic footballers of Egypt
Footballers at the 1936 Summer Olympics
Year of death missing